Bunti Roy (born 7 November 1992) is an Indian cricketer. He made his first-class debut for Tripura in the 2012–13 Ranji Trophy on 22 December 2012.

References

External links
 

1992 births
Living people
Indian cricketers
Tripura cricketers
Place of birth missing (living people)